Lynn Pride (born October 16, 1978) is an American former collegiate and professional basketball player.

Born in Vero Beach, Florida, she attended Sam Houston High School in Arlington, Texas, and during her senior year, she was ranked as one of the nation's top five players by Blue Star Report and was named an All-American by USA Today, Street & Smith's, and Parade Magazine. Pride was named a High School All-American by the WBCA. She participated in the WBCA  High School All-America Game in 1996.
Pride attended college at University of Kansas and graduated in 2000.

In the 2000 WNBA Draft, Pride was selected in the seventh overall pick by the Portland Fire.  After the season, she was traded to the Minnesota Lynx and she played for the Lynx during the 2001, 2002, and part of the 2003 seasons.   After being waived by the Lynx, she signed with the Los Angeles Sparks for the rest of the 2003 season before retiring.

Kansas statistics

USA Basketball
Pride was named to the USA Basketball Women's Junior National Team (now called the U18 team). The team participated in the third Junior World Championship, held in Chetumal, Mexico in late August and early September 1996. The USA team won their early games easily, but lost by four points to the team from Brazil, ending up with the silver medal for the event.

Pride was named to the USA Basketball Women's Junior National Team when it was invited to the 1997 FIBA Junior World Championship (now called U19) held in Natal, Brazil. After beating Japan, the next game was against Australia, the defending champion. The USA team pulled out to a 13-point lead in the second half, but gave up the lead and lost the game 80–74. The USA rebounded with a close 92–88 victory over Cuba, helped by 23 points each from Maylana Martin and Pride. The USA then went on to beat previously unbeaten Russia. After winning the next two games, the USA faced Australia in the gold medal game. The USA team has a three-point lead late, but the Aussies hit a three-pointer with three seconds left in regulation to force overtime. Although the Aussies scored first, the USA team came back, then pulled into the lead and held on to win 78–74 to earn the gold, and the first medal for a USA team at a Junior World Championship. Pride averaged 10.4 points per game and led the teams in steals with 21.

Pride was named to the team representing the USA at the 1998 William Jones Cup competition in Taipei, Taiwan. The USA team, coached by Nell Fortner, won all five games, earning the gold medal for the competition. Pride averaged 9.0 points per game and led the team in steals with 11.

Pride again played with the USA team at the 1999 Pan American Games. The team finished with a record of 4–3, but won the bronze medal with an 85–59 victory over Brazil. Pride averaged 12.9 points per game and was second on the team in steals with 11.

WNBA career statistics

Regular season

|-
| style="text-align:left;"|2000
| style="text-align:left;"|Portland
| 32 || 1 || 14.4 || .347 || .333 || .690 || 1.9 || 1.3 || 0.5 || 0.3 || 1.0 || 3.6
|-
| style="text-align:left;"|2001
| style="text-align:left;"|Minnesota
| 32 || 14 || 22.3 || .391 || .250 || .600 || 4.6 || 0.9 || 0.9 || 0.6 || 1.4 || 5.3
|-
| style="text-align:left;"|2002
| style="text-align:left;"|Minnesota
| 31 || 15 || 19.0 || .385 || .100 || .471 || 3.3 || 1.4 || 0.8 || 0.8 || 1.5 || 4.0
|-
| style="text-align:left;"|2003*
| style="text-align:left;"|Minnesota
| 13 || 0 || 5.1 || .500 || .000 || .750 || 1.3 || 0.1 || 0.2 || 0.1 || 0.6 || 1.3
|-
| style="text-align:left;"|2003*
| style="text-align:left;"|Los Angeles
| 4 || 0 || 7.0 || .000 || .000 || .250 || 1.5 || 0.0 || 0.0 || 0.0 || 0.8 || 0.3
|-
| style="text-align:left;"|Career
| style="text-align:left;"|4 years, 3 teams
| 112 || 30 || 16.6 || .377 || .217 || .607 || 3.0 || 1.0 || 0.6 || 0.5 || 1.2 || 3.8

Playoffs

|-
| style="text-align:left;"|2003
| style="text-align:left;"|Los Angeles
| 6 || 0 || 6.0 || .333 || .000 || 1.000 || 1.5 || 0.2 || 0.3 || 0.2 || 0.5 || 0.8
|-
| style="text-align:left;"| Career
| style="text-align:left;"| 1 years, 1 team
| 6 || 0 || 6.0 || .333 || .000 || 1.000 || 1.5 || 0.2 || 0.3 || 0.2 || 0.5 || 0.8

Notes

External links
WNBA Player Profile

1978 births
Living people
American women's basketball players
Basketball players at the 1999 Pan American Games
Kansas Jayhawks women's basketball players
Portland Fire players
Minnesota Lynx players
Los Angeles Sparks players
Small forwards
Pan American Games bronze medalists for the United States
Pan American Games medalists in basketball
Medalists at the 1999 Pan American Games
United States women's national basketball team players